Ján Hrbek (born 17 September 1981) is a Slovak football striker who currently plays for the Corgoň Liga club MŠK Žilina.

Career
He made his professional debut for MŠK Žilina against FK Dukla Banská Bystrica on 26 October 2013, entering in as a substitute in place of Jakub Paur.

External links
MŠK Žilina profile

References

1981 births
Living people
Slovak footballers
Association football forwards
FK Dukla Banská Bystrica players
MŠK Žilina players
Slovak Super Liga players